Absolute temperature scale can refer to:
 Thermodynamic temperature, the absolute temperature 
 Kelvin scale, an absolute-temperature scale related to the Celsius scale
 Rankine scale, an absolute-temperature scale related to the Fahrenheit scale

For a type of measuring system that begins at an absolute minimum (not necessarily a temperature scale) see:

 Absolute scale